Nathalie Gendron (born 9 July 1967) is a French road racing cyclist.

Born in Lingolsheim (Alsace), she won a gold medal at the 1991 UCI Road World Championships in the team time trial. She won also the Chrono des Herbiers in 1991. In 1993, she won at the French National Track Championships the individual pursuit.

References

External links
 

1967 births
Living people
Sportspeople from Bas-Rhin
French female cyclists
UCI Road World Champions (women)
Cyclists from Grand Est